The Sangachal Terminal is an industrial complex consisting of a natural gas processing plant and oil production plant, located on the coast of the Caspian Sea  south of Baku, Azerbaijan.

History
Construction of the terminal began in 1996 with the Early Oil Project, which foresaw construction of pipelines to Supsa and Novorossiysk. Oil was first exported in October 1997. The terminal has since been expanded to include the ACG Phase 1, Phase 2, Phase 3 Oil Trains, BTC's main pumping station and the Shah Deniz gas plant. Facilities at the oil production plant include separators, coalescers, three new crude oil storage tanks, Export Pumps, gas turbine power generators and a central control room.

Sangachal Terminal Expansion Program
The Sangachal Terminal Expansion Program (STEP) was started in November 2001. The construction included 15,000 cubic metre of concrete, 1,600 units of steel structures,  of pipe,  of cables. Apart from technological works, civil construction included living accommodations for 550 people, cafeteria, movie theater, soccer field, etc. US$1.2-2 billion was spent for sub-projects realized within the STEP project.

The terminal expansion contract was awarded to Tekfen-Azfen joint venture which employed nearly 4,000 employees for the project, 75% of which were Azerbaijani citizens. Due to finalization of the main part of the project, this number was reduced to 1,720 employees.

Technical features
The three new crude oil storage tanks added during the STEP have a capacity of  each. As of November 2009, the terminal exports .

The terminal is operated by a BP led consortium and is one of the largest oil and gas facilities in the world. Other partners are from AIOC, Baku-Tbilisi-Ceyhan pipeline, Shah Deniz and South Caucasus Pipeline projects. The terminal receives oil from the Azeri-Chirag-Guneshli field and natural gas from the Shah Deniz gas field.

The oil is exported via the Baku-Tbilisi-Ceyhan pipeline to Turkey's Mediterranean coast and via the Baku-Supsa Pipeline and the Baku-Novorossiysk Pipeline to the Black Sea coast.
Sangachal Terminal was mentioned in documents published by WikiLeaks as one of US "critical foreign dependencies".

See also

Azeri-Chirag-Guneshli
Natural gas processing
Natural gas condensate
Oil production plant

References

External links
Sangachal Terminal, Caspian Energy Centre

BP buildings and structures
Oil terminals
Natural gas terminals
Petroleum industry in Azerbaijan
Natural gas in Azerbaijan
Energy infrastructure in Azerbaijan
Caspian Sea